Santel's S.C. is a Belizean football team which currently competes in the Belize Premier Football League (BPFL) of the Football Federation of Belize.

The team is based in Santa Elena Town.  Their home stadium is Norman Broaster Stadium.

Football clubs in Belize
2006 establishments in Belize
Association football clubs established in 2006